Destiny: A Chronicle of Deaths Foretold is a 1996 comic book mini-series published by Vertigo, written by Alisa Kwitney and with art by Kent Williams, Michael Zulli, Scott Hampton and Rebecca Guay. A spin-off from Neil Gaiman's Sandman series, it features Destiny of the Endless, a character available for use by other writers because, unlike the other Endless, Gaiman had not created him.

Published in prestige format, each of the three issues detailed a story of a different plague from history, with a framing sequence set in a future world decimated by a new plague. Each issue's story was illustrated by a different artist, with Zulli, Hampton and Guay painting issues one, two and three respectively; the framing story and cover art were by Williams.

The title is a reference to the novel Chronicle of a Death Foretold by Gabriel García Márquez.

Plot 
In October 2009, the world's population has been decimated by the spread of new strain of the Bubonic Plague which is resistant to antibiotics. One small group of survivors, led by Ruth Knight, is visited by a stranger who claims to possess a page from the Book of Destiny that foretells the future. To prove its accuracy he tells stories from the page of the Byzantine Empire during the Plague of Justinian (issue one), a princess at the beginning of the Black Death (issue two) and an Englishwoman during the Great Plague of London (issue three). Destiny himself is involved in each of the stories. The stranger then claims the page predicts the future of the current plague as well, and offers Ruth knowledge of her own destiny.

Awards
Destiny: A Chronicle of Deaths Foretold was nominated for the Eisner Award for "Best Limited Series" in 1998; the award went to Batman: The Long Halloween.

Collected editions
It was collected in 2000 as a 144-page trade paperback with a new introduction by Kwitney.  It is no longer in print.

See also
 List of The Sandman spinoffs

Notes

References

External links
 The Continuity Pages: The Sandman > The Dreaming Era (1996–2001)

1996 comics debuts
Fantasy comics
The Sandman (comic book)
Post-apocalyptic comics
Comics about death
Diseases and disorders in comics
Black Death in fiction
Gothic comics